Enderby Warren Quarry is a  geological Site of Special Scientific Interest north of Enderby in Leicestershire. It is a Geological Conservation Review site.

This former quarry is described by Natural England as nationally important as it is the only one in Britain where it can be shown that palygorskite clay soil has been formed by the action of groundwater on Triassic and pre-Triassic sediments.

The site is private land with no public access.

References

Sites of Special Scientific Interest in Leicestershire
Geological Conservation Review sites